Lambton Jaffas were the Minor Premiers as well as Grand Final winners in 2012.

League tables

Finals

Results

References

External links
 Official website

2012 domestic association football leagues